Martensville-Warman is a provincial electoral district for the Legislative Assembly of Saskatchewan, Canada. It was created from parts of Martensville and was first contested in the 2016 election. It is currently represented by Terry Jenson from the Saskatchewan Party.

With the final report of the 2022 boundary commission, the riding will be eliminated at the next general election. Its two major cities will form the cores of two successor ridings, Martensville-Blairmore and Warman.

Members of the Legislative Assembly

Election results

References

Martensville
Saskatchewan provincial electoral districts